The Jelcz PR110 was a Polish full-size high-floor city bus, manufactured between 1975 and 1992 by Jelczańskie Zakłady Samochodowe in Jelcz-Laskowice, licensed by the French Berliet. It was successor of Jelcz PR100. Differences between PR100 and PR110 was mainly: new transmission, third door pair in PR110 and more Polish parts used in PR110 than in its predecessor.

The bus is designed for city public transport.

Jelcz PR110 was produced on French license with name PR110U till 1983, when the license has expired. Since 1983 bus has been produced with new name, PR110M, but with no important changes.

In years 1976-1992 approximately 12,000 models of PR110 were produced.

See also
Jelcz
Jelcz M11

References
Piechociński Rafał Cezary, Marki, typy i podtypy, czyli pasażerskie legendy do apelu!, in: Pasażerskie krążowniki (i ich historia) na ulicach Słupska - 100-tysięcznej stolicy Pomorza Środkowego, Słupsk 2012, pages 38–59, .
Stiasny Marcin, Atlas autobusów, Poznański Klub Modelarzy Kolejowych, Poznań 2008, page 106, .

Jelcz buses

Vehicles introduced in 1975